The Alfred Phillips House is a historic house located at 404 N. Melvin St. in Gibson City, Illinois. The 1903 Queen Anne house was designed by Bloomington architect George H. Miller. The front of the house features a Classical porch supported by Doric columns, which was rebuilt in 1997. A large gable on the front facade is decorated with diamond-patterned wood shingles. The roof is composed of two hips and four cross gables, including the one in front. Alfred Phillips, the house's first owner, was a local farmer and livestock salesman.

The house was listed on the National Register of Historic Places on February 5, 1999. It is one of five sites on the National Register in Ford County and the only one in the county outside of Paxton, the county seat.

Notes

Houses in Ford County, Illinois
Houses on the National Register of Historic Places in Illinois
National Register of Historic Places in Ford County, Illinois
Houses completed in 1903
Queen Anne architecture in Illinois